Kubachi (alternatively Kubachin) is a language in the Dargin dialect continuum spoken in Dagestan, Russia. It spoken by the Kubachi people that reside in Kubachi. It is often considered a divergent dialect of Dargwa. Ethnologue lists it as a separate language.

Phonology

Vowels

Consonants 
The glottal stop transcribed here is named rather ambiguously a "glottalic laryngeal" by both sources.

References

External links
Kubachins on everyculture.com

Northeast Caucasian languages
Culture of Dagestan